The Corps of Signals (Urdu: ﺁرمى سگنل كور; Army Signal Corps, is an administrative corps and a major intelligence, science and technology formation of the Pakistan Army. The core objectives include research and development, tests, and management of the military communications and information systems used for command and control of the Army combat forces.

History
Initially part of Indian Army Corps of Signals which was established by Royal Engineers in 1911, its members and officers closely allied itself with Royal Corps of Signals, actively participated shoulder-to-shoulder in World War II, at a time when Germany invaded Great Britain.  It came to existence on 14 August 1947, when Indian Army Corps of Signals was divided into two parts by the British Government, with one part remaining in India while other units formed what is now known as Corps of Signals in Pakistan. It was the brain-child of British Army's intelligence officer Major-General R. Cawthome who also founded and established the premier ISI in 1948. The Corps was supplemented with Royal Corps of Signals officers to assist into building the Corps to working strength. As soon as the Pakistan Army's signal officer were trained, the officer quickly replaced the British signal officers and closely allied the Corps with U.S. Army Signal Corps where the U.S. Signal Corps further provided advanced military training to the Corps of Signals.

Major. General. Obedur Rehman was the first SO-in-C of the Corps of Signals. On March 23, 1956, the Corps was re-designed as Corps of Signals, and more objectives were made responsible to Corps. In 1948, the Corps established the Military College of Signals to train the personnel and officers for the Corps. A major re-organization were carried out when Corps officers also helped established the Joint Signal Intelligence (JSI) and the Corps nomenclature was also changed. The regiments and squadrons became as battalions and companies.  In 1962, the unit was sent to Iran to help built the Iranian Army's own Signal corps, and as for its war capabilities, the Corps took participation in 1947 war, 1965 war, 1971 war, 1999 war, with India. The Corps was also involved with Afghanistan war, Bosnian war, and the Bangladesh war, making the Corps as Pakistan Army's principle combatant arm.

As for its capabilities in science and technology, the Corps worked closely with Defence Science and Technology Organization (DESTO) to develop command and control software, and is notable for its participation for developing the communication system for Badr-II satellite.

Units

 2 Signal Battalion
 5 Signal Battalion
 7 Signal Battalion
 8 Signal Battalion
 9 Signal Battalion
 11 Signal Battalion
 12 Signal Battalion
 13 Signal Battalion
 15 Signal Battalion
 17 Signal Battalion
 19 Signal Battalion
 23 Signal Battalion
 24 Signal Battalion
 26 Signal Battalion
 32 Signal Battalion

 44 Signal Battalion
 45 Signal Battalion
 49 Signal Battalion
 51 Signal Battalion
 52 Signal Battalion
 69 Signal Battalion
 76 Signal Battalion
 77 Signal Battalion
 80 Signal Battalion
 82 RC Signal Battalion 
 84 Signal Battalion
 86 Signal Battalion
 92 EW Signal Battalion
 93 Signal Battalion
 28 Signal Battalion

References

External links

 

Signals
Military communications
Military units and formations established in 1947
Pakistan Army
1947 establishments in Pakistan